The Ventura Freeway is a freeway in southern California, United States, running from the Santa Barbara/Ventura county line to Pasadena in Los Angeles County. It is the principal east-west route (designated north-south) through Ventura County and in the southern San Fernando Valley in Los Angeles County.  From the Santa Barbara County line to its intersection with the Hollywood Freeway in the southeastern San Fernando Valley in Los Angeles (the Hollywood Split), it is signed as U.S. Route 101 (US 101), which was built in the late 1950s and opened on April 5, 1960. East of the Hollywood Freeway intersection, it is signed as State Route 134 (SR 134) which was built by 1971.

Prior to the construction of a new alignment in 1971, the portion east of the Golden State Freeway was known as the Colorado Freeway in reference to nearby Colorado Boulevard, a historic thoroughfare in Pasadena and northeastern Los Angeles.

Route description

U.S. Route 101
The Ventura Freeway begins at the Santa Barbara/Ventura county line, west of La Conchita, as US 101. The road alternates between a freeway and an expressway up to the seashore community of Mussel Shoals, when it becomes a freeway for the rest of its length. It travels eastward through the citrus orchards and strawberry fields of the Oxnard Plain before ascending the short, steep Conejo Grade into the Conejo Valley. Continuing eastward through the northern Santa Monica Mountains, it crosses the Ventura/Los Angeles county line before entering the San Fernando Valley. The freeway continues eastward along the valley's southern rim, crossing the San Diego Freeway (Interstate 405) near Sherman Oaks at an interchange consistently rated as one of the five most congested in the nation. It then reaches an interchange with the Hollywood Freeway known as the Hollywood Split. Here, the US 101 designation switches to the southeast-bound Hollywood Freeway, while the Ventura Freeway becomes SR 134 as it continues eastward. The northwest-bound portion of the Hollywood Freeway is designated as SR 170.

The portion of the Ventura Freeway signed as US 101 is signed as a north-south route by CalTrans despite the freeway's actual alignment being east-west. This is due to the fact that US 101 as a whole has a north-south alignment. The apparent inconsistency can be confusing to visitors, as the same freeway entrance can often be signed as "101 North" and "101 West." This is most common in the San Fernando Valley.

California State Route 134

Continuing eastward from the Hollywood Split as SR 134, the Ventura Freeway, now signed as east-west, skirts the northern edge of Griffith Park before intersecting the Golden State Freeway (I-5) and crossing the Los Angeles River. After passing through Downtown Glendale south of the Verdugo Mountains, it continues along the southern slope of the San Rafael Hills between Glendale and Eagle Rock before entering Pasadena near the Arroyo Seco and terminating at the Foothill Freeway (I-210).

The road is the main connector from the San Fernando Valley and points north to the San Gabriel Valley and points east. The future I-710 dead-ends at California Blvd and is signed as SR 710. Residents of South Pasadena have blocked efforts to extend I-710 north to California Boulevard from its current end at Valley Boulevard north of I-10 near the Alhambra/Los Angeles city limit. Signs on SR 134 and I-210 refer to the SR 710 stub in Pasadena as TO SR 110, because exiting left from the SR 710 stub onto California Blvd and turning right on Arroyo Parkway leads directly to SR 110, which is Pasadena's only direct freeway link to Downtown Los Angeles.

Both the SR 134 and US 101 portions of the freeway are part of the California Freeway and Expressway System, and is part of the National Highway System, a network of highways that are considered essential to the country's economy, defense, and mobility by the Federal Highway Administration.

History

History of State Route 134
A pre-freeway alignment of State Route 134 originated at U.S. Route 101 (Ventura Boulevard) and Fulton Avenue in Los Angeles, then along Fulton, Moorpark Street, Riverside Drive and Alameda Avenue before meeting up with U.S. 6/99 (San Fernando Road) in Burbank. It traveled along San Fernando Road to Colorado Street, then ran along Colorado Street (portions of which have been renamed Eagle Vista Drive) through Glendale, Eagle Rock and Pasadena before terminating at U.S. Route 66. The alignment was later cut back to terminate in Studio City at Lankershim and Ventura.

The Interstate 5 off-ramp at Colorado Street is actually a former routing of SR 134, and there are still mileposts that refer to it as such. Old SR 134 followed Colorado Street through Glendale and Colorado Boulevard in Eagle Rock to the ramp connecting Colorado Boulevard and Figueroa Street to the Ventura Freeway.  Old SR 134 continued onto the ramp and then onto what is presently the Ventura Freeway to Orange Grove Boulevard in Pasadena.  The Colorado Boulevard/Figueroa Street ramps plus the segment of freeway between the ramps and just east of Orange Grove Boulevard were previously known as the Colorado Freeway.  

From 1964 to 1992, the Colorado Boulevard portions of Route 134 were renumbered as California State Route 248.

Legal definitions

The official Ventura Freeway designation is Routes 101 and 134 from Route 5 to the Santa Barbara County line. This does not include the portion of Route 134 between Route 5 and Route 210 even though local usage extends the name over this portion of freeway. At the freeway's eastern terminus with Interstate 210 in Pasadena, highway signs indicate "Ventura" as the destination direction for Route 134.

The interchange of SR 134 and I-5 is officially the "Gene Autry Memorial Interchange", after the singing cowboy superstar Gene Autry. Autry's Museum of the American West is located near the interchange in Griffith Park.

Assembly Concurrent Resolution 54, Chapter 85 in 2003 also designated Route 101 in Ventura County as the "Screaming Eagles Highway". This honors the 101st Airborne Division of the United States Army, which formed on July 23, 1918 and has been involved in every major war that the United States has participated in since then.

The California Legislature passed a resolution in 2017 to designate the easternmost segment of the SR 134 freeway between SR 2 and its terminus at I-210 as the "President Barack H. Obama Highway", in honor of the 44th U.S. President Barack Obama, who had attended Occidental College in Eagle Rock from 1979 to 1981. Signs were posted on December 20, 2018.

Projects
The proposed Wallis Annenberg Wildlife Crossing is a vegetated overpass spanning the Ventura Freeway and Agoura Road at Liberty Canyon in Agoura Hills. When built, it will be one of the largest urban wildlife crossing in the United States, connecting the Simi Hills and the Santa Monica Mountains over a busy freeway with ten traffic lanes (including exit lanes).

Ventura Freeway currently carries the Los Angeles Metro express bus route 501 between Pasadena and North Hollywood. Portions of SR 134 are also being considered as part of a Bus Rapid Transit project.

Exit list
This exit list proceeds from east to west, since the majority of the freeway is the north-south US 101.

See also

Colorado Street

References

External links

California @ AARoads — State Route 134
Caltrans: Route 134 highway conditions
California Highways: SR 134
Colorado Freeway History

Southern California freeways
Named freeways in California
U.S. Route 101
Roads in Los Angeles County, California
Roads in Ventura County, California
Transportation in Glendale, California
Transportation in Los Angeles
Transportation in Pasadena, California
Transportation in the San Fernando Valley
Conejo Valley
Ventura, California
State highways in California